The Tuzla chub (Squalius aristotelis) is a cyprinid fish endemic to the Lake Tuzla drainage in Turkey.

References

Squalius
Fish described in 2011